Corto Maltese is a series of adventure comics created in 1967 by Hugo Pratt.

Corto Maltese may also refer to:

 Corto Maltese (DC Comics), a fictional country featured in DC Comics books
 "Corto Maltese" (Arrow episode), an episode of Arrow
 Maltese Corso, a 1530–1798 naval operation by Knights Hospitaller